The 2007 Asian Women's Youth Handball Championship (2nd tournament) took place in Taipei from 23 July–28 July. It acts as the Asian qualifying tournament for the 2008 Women's Youth World Handball Championship in Slovakia.

Results

Final standing

See also
 List of sporting events in Taiwan

References
 www.handball.jp (Archived 2009-09-04)

External links
 www.asianhandball.com

International sports competitions hosted by Taiwan
Asian Women's Youth Handball Championship, 2007
Asia
Asian Handball Championships